Gwalia is an archaic Welsh name for Wales.

Gwalia may also refer to:

 Gwalia, Liverpool, building
 D. Gwalia, musician
 Gwalia Singers (Swansea), male voice choir
 Gwalia, Western Australia, town located in Western Australia's Great Victoria Desert
 Gwalia Gold Mine, gold mine in Western Australia
 Sons of Gwalia, company